The 2016 season was the San Diego Chargers' 47th in the National Football League, their 57th overall, their 56th and final season in San Diego, California and their fourth and final season under head coach Mike McCoy.

Due to the age of Qualcomm Stadium, there was speculation that the team would be relocating back to Los Angeles, where the franchise played its first season in 1960. This followed a decision by the NFL to allow the St. Louis Rams to return to the Greater Los Angeles Area with a provision that the Chargers may relocate to Los Angeles as well. On January 4, 2016, the team filed a relocation application to the NFL along with the Rams and the Oakland Raiders releasing a statement and a video on the team's website. The league made its decision in a special meeting on January 12; it approved the Chargers' relocation if they chose to share SoFi Stadium with the Rams (the Raiders-Chargers proposal did not receive enough support from the league as a whole to proceed, prompting the Raiders to back out). On January 29, 2016, the Chargers announced they would remain in San Diego for the 2016 season as negotiations with the city continued; the team also reached an agreement in principle to use the Rams' Los Angeles stadium should negotiations with the city of San Diego fail.
On November 8, 2016, Measure C was voted down by voters 57% to 43%; and on January 12, 2017, the Chargers officially announced a move to Los Angeles, making 2016 their final season in San Diego.

This would also be the first time in nine seasons that Pro Bowler free safety Eric Weddle was not on the team, having departed via free agency to the Baltimore Ravens. Weddle had spent his entire career with the Chargers, starting with the 2007 NFL season.

On January 1, 2017, the Chargers fired McCoy after four seasons.

Offseason

Roster Changes

Signed

Departures

Draft

Notes
 The Chargers traded their 2016 fifth-round selection, along with their 2015 first- and fourth-round selections to the San Francisco 49ers in exchange for the 49ers' 2015 first-round selection.
 The Chargers acquired an additional sixth-round selection in a trade that sent guard Jeremiah Sirles to the Minnesota Vikings.
 As the result of a negative differential of free agent signings and departures that the Chargers experienced during the  free agency period, the team received one compensatory selection for the 2016 draft in the fifth round. Free agent transactions that occurred after May 12, 2015, did not impact the team's formula for determining compensatory selections for the 2016 draft.

Staff

Final roster

Schedule

Preseason

Regular season

Note: Intra-division opponents are in bold text.

Game summaries

Week 1: at Kansas City Chiefs

Leading 21–3 at halftime, the Chargers blew their lead, scoring only six more points by field goals. Kansas City rallied with 24 unanswered points, forcing overtime, where the Chiefs won the season's opening game.

Week 2: vs. Jacksonville Jaguars

Already without Keenan Allen for the entire season, running back Danny Woodhead suffered a torn ACL, putting him out for the season. Nevertheless, the Chargers would go on to burn the Jaguars, winning 38–14 and with that, they went to 1–1.

Week 3: at Indianapolis Colts
With a stunning loss on a 63-yard Colts touchdown pass to T.Y. Hilton with 1:17 to play, the Chargers' record fell to 1–2.

Week 4: vs. New Orleans Saints
Ahead 34–21, the Chargers gave up two Drew Brees touchdown passes in the final five minutes and fell to 1–3.

Week 5: at Oakland Raiders

With their third straight loss to the Raiders, the Chargers fell to 1–4.

Week 6: vs. Denver Broncos

The Chargers wore Color Rush uniforms with shades of blue and yellow San Diego used from 1974 until 1984.

The team snapped a 3-game losing streak against the Broncos and improved to 2–4.

Week 7: at Atlanta Falcons

The Chargers came into this game with a 1–8 all-time record against Atlanta, and this marked San Diego's first visit to Atlanta since 2004. The Falcons had built a 27–10 lead by the two-minute warning at the end of the first half, but the Chargers pulled them back and leveled the score at 30–30 with a 33-yard Josh Lambo field goal with 18 seconds left in regulation. Lambo then hit a 42-yard attempt in overtime to seal the win for the Chargers as they improved to 3–4.

Week 8: at Denver Broncos

Week 9: vs. Tennessee Titans
This turned out to be the Chargers last win in San Diego. They lost their last 4 games at Qualcomm Stadium.

Week 10: vs. Miami Dolphins

Philip Rivers would throw four fourth quarter interceptions in this game, including a crucial pick-6 with a minute remaining that was returned by Kiko Alonso.

With the loss, the Chargers went into their bye week at 4–6.

Week 12: at Houston Texans

This would end up being the last win for the Chargers in franchise history while in San Diego.

Week 13: vs. Tampa Bay Buccaneers

Week 14: at Carolina Panthers

Week 15: vs. Oakland Raiders
 With the loss, the Chargers were mathematically eliminated from playoff contention for the 3rd straight year, and 7th time in 8 years.

Week 16: at Cleveland Browns

The loss dropped the Chargers to 5–10, and they became the only team to lose to the Cleveland Browns in 2016.

Week 17: vs. Kansas City Chiefs

With their sixth straight loss to the Chiefs, the Chargers finished the season 5–11. This would be the final game played as the San Diego Chargers before relocating to Los Angeles following the season.

Standings

Division

Conference

References

External links
 

San Diego
San Diego Chargers seasons
San Diego Chargers